Millwall station may mean:
Millwall Docks railway station, station on the Millwall Extension Railway, closed 1926
Millwall Junction railway station, station on the London and Blackwall Railway, closed 1926
Millwall tube station, unbuilt Jubilee line station proposed in the 1970s

Disambig-Class London Transport articles